Roztoky is a municipality and village in Rakovník District in the Central Bohemian Region of the Czech Republic. It has about 1,000 inhabitants. It is located on the Berounka River.

References

Villages in Rakovník District